Lis Vega is a Cuban actress, singer, vedette and model, best known for her roles in the Mexican TV series Santa Diabla and Amorcito corazón.

Personal life 
Vega was born as Liseska Vega Gálvez on October 20, 1977, in Havana, Cuba. She is married to Mauro Rivera and has one sister, Lieska Vega Gálvez. Her parents, Lázaro Vega and Martha Elena Gálvez, divorced when she was ten years old.

At 15, Vega went to Italy in a cultural exchange where she participated in the TV show Cuba 95. In 1997, she emigrated to Mexico.

In 2008, Vega married Federico Díaz, who later confessed his homosexuality to her, ending their marriage after only four months.

On February 11, 2013, she married Chilean Mauro Rivero after a month of dating, when they had known each other only eight months.

Career 
Vega lived in Mérida, Yucatán when after emigrating to Mexico, then moved to Mexico City where she attracted the attention of Juan Osorio. In 2004 Vega accepted the role as fellow Cuban, Niurka Marcos, in Mi Verdad which was produced by Osorio, a docudrama about the "roller coaster" relationship between Niurka and Osorio.

Vega appeared in Playboy magazine in 2003, 2011 and in 2016. She appeared on the cover in 2011 and in 2016 she was featured as part of a tribute to vedettes which included a six-day, two-week stage show of Vega singing and dancing burlesque, tango and the Mexican hat dance at the Ferrocarrilero Theater in Mexico City, Mexico.

In 2005 Vega participated in Big Brother VIP: México, she was the 13th out of 25 to be expelled from the competition.

In 2013 Vega participated in Santa Diabla as Lisette Guerrero, after moving to Miami. In 2014 Vega took part in Miami Fashion Week. That same year she performed as "Fly" in Goooza: A Musical Cabaret Show at the Flamingo Theater Bar in Miami, Fl as well as in a tribute to Charlie Chaplin called Burlesque.

By 2016 Vega had become an "internet sensation". She had acquired 183,000 followers on Instagram with videos of her workouts, one of which had gone viral.

In 2018 Vega recorded the single "Como a Nadie le Importa" with fellow Cuban Romi.

Filmography

Films

Television

TV series

References

External links 

1977 births
Living people
Cuban television actresses
Cuban female models
21st-century Cuban women singers